The knock-out stage of the 2014 AFC Cup was played from 13 May to 18 October 2014. A total of 16 teams competed in the knock-out stage.

Qualified teams
The winners and runners-up of each of the eight groups in the group stage qualified for the knock-out stage. Both West Asia Zone and East Asia Zone had eight teams qualified.

Format
In the knock-out stage, the 16 teams played a single-elimination tournament. In the quarter-finals and semi-finals, each tie was played on a home-and-away two-legged basis, while in the round of 16 and final, each tie was played as a single match. The away goals rule (for two-legged ties), extra time (away goals do not apply in extra time) and penalty shoot-out were used to decide the winner if necessary.

Schedule
The schedule of each round was as follows.

Bracket
In the round of 16, the winners of one group played the runners-up of another group in the same zone, with the group winners hosting the match. The matchups were determined as follows:

West Asia Zone
Winner Group A vs. Runner-up Group C
Winner Group C vs. Runner-up Group A
Winner Group B vs. Runner-up Group D
Winner Group D vs. Runner-up Group B

East Asia Zone
Winner Group E vs. Runner-up Group G
Winner Group G vs. Runner-up Group E
Winner Group F vs. Runner-up Group H
Winner Group H vs. Runner-up Group F

The draw for the quarter-finals was held on 28 May 2014, 15:00 UTC+8, at the AFC House in Kuala Lumpur, Malaysia. Teams from different zones could be drawn into the same tie, and the "country protection" rule was applied, so teams from the same association could not be drawn into the same tie.

There was no draw for the semi-finals, with the matchups determined by the quarter-final draw: Winner QF1 vs. Winner QF2 and Winner QF3 vs. Winner QF4, with winners QF2 and QF4 hosting the second leg.

The draw to decide the host team of the final was held after the quarter-final draw.

Round of 16

|-
!colspan=3|West Asia Zone

|-
!colspan=3|East Asia Zone

Notes

Quarter-finals

First leg

Second leg

Persipura Jayapura won 8–4 on aggregate.

Kitchee won 4–3 on aggregate.

3–3 on aggregate. Al-Qadsia won on away goals.

Erbil won 3–0 on aggregate.

Notes

Semi-finals

First leg

Notes

Second leg

Al-Qadsia won 10–2 on aggregate.

Erbil won 3–2 on aggregate.

Final

Notes

References

External links
AFC Cup, the-AFC.com

3